Bethesda is an unincorporated, census-designated place in southern Montgomery County, Maryland, United States. It is located just northwest of Washington, D.C. It takes its name from a local church, the Bethesda Meeting House (1820, rebuilt 1849), which in turn took its name from Jerusalem's Pool of Bethesda. The National Institutes of Health's main campus and the Walter Reed National Military Medical Center are in Bethesda, in addition to a number of corporate and government headquarters.

As an unincorporated community, Bethesda has no official boundaries. According to the 2020 U.S. census, the community had a total population of 68,056.

History
Bethesda is located in a region that was populated by the Piscataway and Nacotchtank tribes at the time of European colonization. Fur trader Henry Fleet became the first European to visit the area, reaching it by sailing up the Potomac River. He stayed with the Piscataway tribe from 1623 to 1627, either as a guest or prisoner (historical accounts differ). Fleet eventually secured funding for another expedition to the region and was later granted proprietary rights to 2,000 acres of land in the nascent colony and became a member of Maryland’s colonial legislature. Raids from the Senecas and Susquehannock resulted in the creation of the Maryland division of Rangers in 1694 to patrol the frontier.

Most settlers in colonial Maryland were tenant farmers who paid their rent in tobacco, and colonists continued to expand farther north in search of fertile land. Henry Darnall (1645–1711) surveyed a  area in 1694 which became the first land grant in Bethesda. Tobacco farming was the primary way of life in Bethesda throughout the 1700s. The city avoided seeing action during the Revolutionary War, although it became a supply region for the fledgling Continental Navy. The establishment of Washington, D.C. in 1790 deprived Montgomery County of its economic center at Georgetown, although the event had little effect on the small farmers throughout Bethesda.

Between 1805 and 1821, Bethesda became a rural way station after the development of the Washington and Rockville Turnpike, which carried tobacco and other products between Georgetown and Rockville, and north to Frederick. A small settlement grew around a store and tollhouse along the turnpike by 1862 known as "Darcy's Store", named after the store's owner William E. Darcy. The settlement was renamed in 1871 by postmaster Robert Franck after the Bethesda Meeting House, a Presbyterian church built in 1820.

Bethesda did not develop beyond a small crossroads village through the 19th century. It consisted of a blacksmith shop, a church and school, and a few houses and stores. In 1852, the postmaster general established a post office in Bethesda and appointed Rev. A. R. Smith its first postmaster. A streetcar line was established in 1890 and suburbanization increased in the early 1900s, and Bethesda grew in population. Communities situated near railroad lines had grown the fastest during the 19th century. Still, mass production of the automobile ended that dependency and Bethesda planners grew the community with the transportation revolution in mind. This included becoming a key stopping point for the B & O railroad on their Georgetown Branch line completed around 1910 that ran from Silver Spring to Georgetown, passing through Bethesda on the way. The branch had a storage yard there and multiple sidings that served the industries in Bethesda in the early 20th century. B & O successor CSX ceased train service on the line in 1985, so the county transformed it into a trail in the rails-to-trails movement. The tracks were removed in 1994, and the first part of the trail was opened in 1998; it has become the most used rail-trail in the United States, averaging over one million users per year.

Subdivisions began to appear on old farmland in the late 19th century, becoming the neighborhoods of Drummond, Woodmont, Edgemoor, and Battery Park. Farther north, several wealthy men made Rockville Pike famous for its mansions. These included Brainard W. Parker ("Cedarcroft", 1892), James Oyster ("Strathmore", 1899), George E. Hamilton ("Hamilton House", 1904; now the Stone Ridge School), Luke I. Wilson ("Tree Tops", 1926), Gilbert Hovey Grosvenor ("Wild Acres", 1928–29), and George Freeland Peter ("Stone House", 1930). In 1930, Dr Armistead Peter's pioneering manor house "Winona" (1873) became the clubhouse of the Woodmont Country Club on land that is now part of the National Institutes of Health (NIH) campus. Merle Thorpe's mansion "Pook's Hill" (1927, razed 1948) became the home-in-exile of the Norwegian Royal Family during World War II.

World War II and the subsequent expansion of government further fed the rapid growth of Bethesda. Both the National Naval Medical Center (1940–42) and the NIH complex (1948) were built just to the north of the developing downtown, and this drew government contractors, medical professionals, and other businesses to the area. In recent years, Bethesda has become the major urban core and employment center of southwestern Montgomery County. This recent vigorous growth has followed the 1984 expansion of Metrorail with a station in Bethesda. Alan Kay built the Bethesda Metro Center over the Red line metro rail, which opened up further commercial and residential development in the immediate vicinity. In the 2000s, the strict height limits on construction in the District of Columbia led to the development of mid-and high-rise office and residential towers around the Bethesda Metro stop, effectively creating a major urban center.

Geography

The main commercial corridor that passes through Bethesda is Maryland Route 355 (known as Wisconsin Avenue in Bethesda and as Rockville Pike and Hungerford Drive in more northern communities), which, to the north, connects Bethesda with the communities of North Bethesda and Rockville, ending, after several name changes, in Frederick. Toward the South, Rockville Pike becomes Wisconsin Avenue near the NIH Campus and continues beyond Bethesda through Chevy Chase, Friendship Heights and into Washington, D.C., ending in Georgetown.

The area commonly known as Downtown Bethesda is centered at the intersection of Wisconsin Avenue, Old Georgetown Road and East-West Highway. This intersection is approximately two and one-half miles from Washington, DC's western boundary, making Bethesda a close-in suburb of Washington. Other focal points of downtown Bethesda include the Woodmont Triangle, bordered by Old Georgetown Road (Maryland Route 187), Woodmont and Rugby Avenues, and the Bethesda Row, centered at the intersection of Woodmont Avenue and Bethesda Avenue. Much of the dense construction in that area followed the opening of the Bethesda station on the Red Line of the Washington Metro rapid transit system, also located at this intersection and the centerpiece of the Bethesda Metro Center development. The Medical Center Metro stop lies approximately 0.7 miles north of the Bethesda stop, Medical Center, which serves the NIH Campus, the Walter Reed National Military Medical Center, and the Uniformed Services University of the Health Sciences.

Demographics

2000
As of the census of 2000, there were 55,277 people, 23,659 households, and 14,455 families residing in the CDP. The racial makeup of the CDP was 85.86% White, 2.67% Black or African American, 0.17% Native American, 7.92% Asian, 0.05% Pacific Islander, 1.23% from other races, and 2.11% from two or more races. 5.43% of the population were Hispanic or Latino of any race.

There were 23,659 households, out of which 28.0% had children under the age of 18 living with them, 53.4% were married couples living together, 6.0% had a female householder with no husband present, and 38.9% were non-families. 32.2% of all households were made up of individuals, and 11.6% had someone living alone who was 65 years of age or older. The average household size was 2.30, and the average family size was 2.92.

In the CDP, 21.8% of the population was under the age of 18, 4.6% from 18 to 24, 29.2% from 25 to 44, 27.1% from 45 to 64, and 17.2% was 65 years of age or older. The median age was 41 years. For every 100 females, there were 87.7 males. For every 100 females age 18 and over, there were 84.0 males.

Bethesda is a very wealthy and well-educated area. According to the 2000 Census, Bethesda was the best-educated city in the United States of America, with a population of 50,000 or more. 79% of residents 25 or older have bachelor's degrees, and 49% have graduate or professional degrees. According to a 2007 estimate, the median income for a household in the CDP was $117,723, and the median income for a family was $168,385. Males had a median income of $84,797 versus $57,569 for females. The per capita income for the CDP was $58,479. About 1.7% of families and 3.3% of the population were below the poverty line, including 1.8% of those under age 18 and 4.1% of those age 65 or over. Many commute to Washington, D.C. for work. The average price of a four-bedroom, two-bath home in Bethesda in 2010 was $806,817 (which ranks it as the twentieth most expensive community in America).

Bethesda is often associated with its neighboring communities, Potomac, Chevy Chase, Great Falls, Virginia, and McLean, Virginia, for their similar demographics.

Landmarks

Important medical institutions located in Bethesda include the National Institutes of Health campus, Walter Reed National Military Medical Center, and the adjoining Uniformed Services University of the Health Sciences, as well as a number of other military medical and research institutions. Other federal institutions include the Consumer Product Safety Commission and the Naval Surface Warfare Center Carderock Division.

The headquarters of defense conglomerate Lockheed Martin, managed health care company Coventry Health Care and hotel and resort chains Marriott International and Host Hotels & Resorts, Inc. are located in Bethesda. Software company Bethesda Softworks was originally located in Bethesda but moved to Rockville in 1990. The Discovery Channel also had its headquarters in Bethesda before relocating to Silver Spring in 2004. On the professional services side, numerous banks (PNC, Capital One Bank) brokerage firms (MorganStanley, Merrill Lynch, Charles Schwab, Fidelity) and law firms (Ballard Spahr, JDKatz, Paley Rothman, Lerch Early & Brewer) maintain offices in Bethesda. Bethesda has two farmers markets, the Montgomery Farm Woman's Cooperative Market and the Bethesda Central Farmer's Market. In the summer of 2021, Fox Television Stations relocated the broadcast facilities of its Washington-area television stations, WTTG and WDCA, to Bethesda.

Bethesda is the home of Congressional Country Club, which is recognized as one of the world's most prestigious private country clubs. Congressional has hosted four major golf championships, including the 2011 U.S. Open, won by Rory McIlroy. The AT&T National, hosted by Tiger Woods, has been played at Congressional four times. Bethesda is also home of the exclusive Burning Tree Club, Bethesda Country Club, and the Bethesda Big Train, a summer collegiate baseball team.

A number of ambassador residences are in Bethesda, including Bangladesh, Haiti, Cape Verde, Guyana, Honduras, Lesotho, Morocco, Nicaragua, Uruguay, and Zimbabwe.

Also located in downtown Bethesda is one of the Madonna of the Trail monuments, erected by the National Old Trails Association working in concert with the Daughters of the American Revolution; U.S. President Harry S. Truman presided over the dedication of the Bethesda monument, on April 19, 1929. Nearby is the Bethesda Post Office. Also starting in the heart of downtown Bethesda is the Capital Crescent Trail which follows the old tracks of the B&O Railroad stretching from Georgetown, Washington, D.C., to Silver Spring, MD. Walter Reed Medical Center and the Bethesda Theater are two important Art Deco architectural structures in the suburbs surrounding Washington, D.C.

Bethesda Row

Federal Realty Investment Trust has developed much of the west side of downtown Bethesda into an area called Bethesda Row, incorporating principles of new urbanism and a mixed-use district including residential apartments and condos (100,000 ft2), retail (300,000 ft2), dining, office space (100,000 ft2), hotels, entertainment, public art and fountains, forming the new core of the revitalized Downtown. Retail stores include an Apple Store, Anthropologie, and popular bagel store Bethesda Bagels.

Education
It is within Montgomery County Public Schools.

Public primary schools located in Bethesda include:
 Ashburton Elementary School
 Bannockburn Elementary School
 Bethesda Elementary School
 Bradley Hills Elementary School
 Burning Tree Elementary School
 Carderock Springs Elementary School
 Seven Locks Elementary School
 Westbrook Elementary School (The only building in Montgomery County MD built under the WPA)
 Wood Acres Elementary School
 Wyngate Elementary School

Public middle schools located in Bethesda include:
 North Bethesda Middle School
 Thomas W. Pyle Middle School
 Westland Middle School

Public high schools located in Bethesda include:
 Bethesda-Chevy Chase High School
 Walt Whitman High School
 Walter Johnson High School

Private schools located in Bethesda include:
 Bethesda Community School
 Feynman School
 Rochambeau French International School - The secondary campus/administrative headquarters (Forest Road Campus) and the preschool campus (Bradley Campus) is in Bethesda. Circa 2022, the school plans to open a new preschool, and elementary campus in Bethesda.
 Georgetown Preparatory School
 The Harbor School
 Holton-Arms
 Landon
 Little Flower School (K–8)
 Mater Dei School
 Norwood (in the Potomac CDP)
 Oneness-Family School
 Our Lady of Lourdes School
 St. Andrew's Episcopal School (in the Potomac CDP)
 St. Bartholomew (Blue Ribbon elementary school PK–8)
 Saint Jane de Chantal Catholic School (preK–8)
 Sidwell Friends School (Lower School)
 Stone Ridge School of the Sacred Heart
 Washington Episcopal School (N–8)
 Washington Waldorf School
 The Woods Academy

Bethesda is also home to a federally funded and operated health science university, the Uniformed Services University of the Health Sciences (USU). The primary mission of USU is to prepare graduates for service in the Medical Corps of the U.S. Army, Navy, Air Force, and Public Health Service. The university consists of the F. Edward Hebert School of Medicine, a medical school, and the Graduate School of Nursing, a nursing school. National Intelligence University is also in Bethesda.

The Washington Japanese Language School (WJLS, ワシントン日本語学校 Washington Nihongo Gakkō), a supplementary weekend Japanese school, holds its classes at the Stone Ridge School of the Sacred Heart in Bethesda. The WJLS maintains its school office in North Bethesda, adjacent to Garrett Park. The institution, giving supplemental education to Japanese-speaking children in the Washington, D.C., area, was founded in 1958, making it the oldest Japanese government-sponsored supplementary school in the U.S.

The Writer's Center in Bethesda publishes Poet Lore, the longest continuously running poetry journal in the United States.

Economy

Notable companies based in Bethesda include:

 AdvisorShares
 AREVA (U.S. headquarters)
 ASCII Group
 Calvert Investments
 Cambridge Information Group
 Clark Construction
 Coventry Health Care
 Cystic Fibrosis Foundation
 Enviva
 Fox Television Stations
 WTTG and WDCA
 HMSHost
 Host Hotels & Resorts
 International Neuroethics Society
 JBG Smith
 Lockheed Martin
 Marriott International
 NBC Sports Washington
 Ritz Carlton
 RLJ Companies
 United States Enrichment Corporation
 Youth For Understanding USA
 Wellness Corporate Solutions

Management
Downtown Bethesda is managed by the Bethesda Urban Partnership, a non-profit organization established in 1994 by Montgomery County.

Transportation
Washington Metro's Red Line services two primary locations in Bethesda: the downtown area at the Bethesda station, and the area near the National Institutes of Health and the Walter Reed Medical Center at the Medical Center station. The Maryland Transit Administration's Purple Line, a light rail line currently under construction, will provide a direct connection from Bethesda to Silver Spring, the University of Maryland, College Park, and New Carrollton. The Purple Line will allow riders from Bethesda to move between the Red, Green, and Orange lines of the Washington Metro transportation system, as well as to MARC and Amtrak trains, without needing to ride into central Washington, D.C.

Local buses include:
 WMATA's Metrobus
The Montgomery County Ride On bus system also has several routes through Bethesda. 
Bethesda Circulator, a free loop bus that operates Monday-Saturday and covers most of downtown Bethesda.

Long-distance buses include Vamoose Bus and Tripper Bus, both of which provide service from downtown Bethesda to the proximity of Penn Station in Midtown Manhattan, New York City.
 	
Tripper Bus, a privately owned company, provides service from Bethesda 4681 Willow Ln, Bethesda, MD 20814 at the corner of Wisconsin Ave., opposite side of Panera Bread, the same side of Bethesda's Farm Women's Market to New York City between 8th and 9th Ave near Penn Station, in close to proximity to Port Authority Bus Terminal.

Notable people

 José Andrés, chef
 Trace Armstrong, former NFL player
 Red Auerbach, former NBA coach
 Deane Beman, PGA Tour Commissioner and professional golfer
 Aran Bell, ballet dancer
 Ezra Taft Benson, the Secretary of Agriculture under President Eisenhower, and former president of the Church of Jesus Christ of Latter-day Saints
 Wolf Blitzer, journalist
 James Brown, sportscaster
 Preston Burpo, former MLS player
 Patrick Byrne, entrepreneur
 Andrea Carroll, soprano
 Michael Cerveris, actor
 Connie Chung, television journalist
 Colin Cloherty, NFL player
 Steve Coll, journalist and author
 Candy Crowley, journalist
 E. J. Dionne, journalist, political commentator, and author
 David Dobkin, director, screenwriter, and producer
Michael Dunn, National Football League (NFL) offensive lineman
 William Eacho, former U.S. ambassador to Austria
 Gregg Easterbrook, sports columnist.
 Jo Ann Emerson, former U.S. Representative, Missouri
 Kenneth Feinberg, attorney
 John Feinstein, author
 Thomas Frank, journalist and author
 Neal Fredericks, cinematographer
 Thomas Friedman, journalist and author
 Merrick Garland, 86th United States Attorney General
 Howard Gutman, former U.S. ambassador to Belgium
 Mark Halperin, journalist and author
 Steve Handelsman, journalist
 Laura Hillenbrand, author
 Henry Hodges, actor most famous for playing Horace Robedaux in The Orphans' Home Cycle.
 Antawn Jamison, basketball player
 Walter Johnson, baseball player
 Spike Jonze, director, producer, screenwriter, and actor
 Larry Kaufman, chess Grandmaster
 Julie Kent, ballet dancer
 Greg Koch, former NFL player
 Ferenc Körmendi, Hungarian novelist and broadcaster
 Tim Kurkjian, ESPN analyst
 Katie Ledecky, swimmer
 Nils Lofgren, musician
 Julia Louis-Dreyfus, actress 
 Justin Maxwell, MLB player
 Allison Macfarlane, chair of the Nuclear Regulatory Commission.
 Matt McCoy, actor
 Alice McDermott, author
Sean Murray, actor
Alondra Nelson, sociologist and Dean of Social Science at Columbia University
 Martin O'Malley, politician, former governor of Maryland, former Democratic presidential candidate
 Reza Pahlavi, Iranian royalty, son of Iran's last monarch.
 Periphery, progressive metal band
 Maury Povich, television host
 Mark Pryor, former U.S. Senator, Arkansas
 Giuliana Rancic, celebrity news personality
 Patricia Richardson, actress, Home Improvement
 James Risen, journalist
 Alexandra Robbins, author
 Cokie Roberts, journalist and author
 Wayne Rooney, British soccer player
 Richard Schiff, actor
 Dan Shanoff, sports columnist
 David Simon, author, journalist, and television producer
 Gordon Smith, former U.S. Senator, Oregon
 Daniel Stern, actor
 Jacob Tamarkin, mathematician
 George Spiro Thanos, martial artist champion
 Jeff Tremaine, director, screenwriter, and producer
 Christopher Weaver, software developer
Meredith Whitney (born 1969), businesswoman 
 Thomas Wieser, American-Austrian economist
 Michael Wilbon, journalist, sportscaster
 Gedion Zelalem, professional footballer (soccer)

See also
 Bethesda Magazine
 Washington metropolitan area

References

External links

 Greater Bethesda-Chevy Chase Chamber of Commerce 
 Bethesda Urban Partnership

 
Populated places established in 1820
1820 establishments in Maryland
Census-designated places in Montgomery County, Maryland
Census-designated places in Maryland
Baltimore–Washington metropolitan area